Israel Fernando Chango Jaramillo (born January 16, 1989) is an Ecuadorian footballer. He is a midfielder. He was part of the squad who won the 2008 Copa Libertadores with LDU Quito.

Club career
Chango started out in the youth ranks of LDU Quito. In 2007, he received a promotion to the regular team and is now used several times. He is seen as a future starter for his club. Although he did not play any games for Liga in the tournament, his team went on to win the title by penalties. His team is the first Ecuadorian team to win the Copa Libertadores in history.

International career
Chango played a key role for the U-20 national team for Ecuador. He played in the 2007 Pan American Games in Group A. The team won Group A and were the only ones to qualify from that group. He scored his only goal for the U-20 side in a game against Honduras. Ecuador went on to defeat Bolivia 1–0 in the semifinal and later Jamaica 2–1 to claim Ecuador's first ever international title. He will be called up once again to participate in the 2009 South American Youth Championship in Venezuela as one of the key players.

Honors

National team
 Ecuador U-20
 Pan American Games: Gold Medal

References

External links
Chango's FEF Player Card

1989 births
Living people
People from Pastaza Province
Association football midfielders
Ecuadorian footballers
L.D.U. Quito footballers
L.D.U. Loja footballers
C.S.D. Macará footballers
Footballers at the 2007 Pan American Games
Pan American Games gold medalists for Ecuador
Pan American Games medalists in football
Medalists at the 2007 Pan American Games